Peter Cousens  (born 2 November 1955) is an Australian actor and singer born in Tamworth, New South Wales. He is the artistic director of the Talent Development Project. He attended The Armidale School in Armidale from 1969 to 1973 and then Gordonstoun School, Scotland. He then spent a year reading Arts at St Paul's College, University of Sydney, before studying at the National Institute of Dramatic Art (NIDA), graduating in 1978. Cousens was appointed a Member of the Order of Australia in the Queens Birthday Honours in June 2019 for services to the performing arts and the community.

Career 
Cousens is currently the artistic director of the Talent Development Project. He has worked in television, both as an actor and presenter. In the 1980s he guest starred in a number of major Australian television productions, including The Timeless Land, Earth Watch, The Sullivans, The Young Doctors, Sons and Daughters and The Restless Years. He then went on to take leading roles in Under Capricorn and Return to Eden.

Cousens is also known for his work in musical theatre. Major roles include the Phantom in London's West End production of The Phantom of the Opera (1986); he also portrayed Marius in Les Misérables, Alex in Aspects of Love, Tony in West Side Story, Bobby in Company Nanki Poo in The Mikado, and Chris in Miss Saigon in the Australian productions. Cousens appeared in the 2015 television opera The Divorce. He has received a number of Variety Club of Australia awards for his work.

Cousens has performed on a number of cast and solo albums. He sang the role of Chris on the International Symphonic Recording of Miss Saigon and the Australian musical The Hatpin.

In September 2006 he launched Kookaburra: The National Musical Theatre Company, a non-profit theatre company based in Australia, dedicated to musical theatre. The company closed in 2009.

In 2012–13, Cousens produced and directed Freedom, starring Cuba Gooding Jr, William Sadler and Sharon Leal.

Discography

Charting albums

References

External links
 
 
 Kookaburra Musical Theatre website

Australian male stage actors
Australian male television actors
Australian male musical theatre actors
People educated at Gordonstoun
National Institute of Dramatic Art alumni
Living people
1955 births
People from Tamworth, New South Wales